Unheimliche Geschichten ( Uncanny Stories), titled The Living Dead in English, is a 1932 German horror/comedy film directed by the prolific Austrian film director Richard Oswald, starring Paul Wegener, and produced by Gabriel Pascal. It is a remake of Oswald's 1919 film of the same name.

The story is a merging of three separate short stories, Edgar Allan Poe's The Black Cat, The System of Doctor Tarr and Professor Fether and Robert Louis Stevenson's The Suicide Club, set within a story frame of a reporter's hunt for a crazy scientist. It is a black comedy revisiting many of the classic themes of the horror genre. It was Paul Wegener's first talking movie.

Plot 
A crazed scientist, Morder (Paul Wegener), driven even crazier by his nagging wife, murders her and walls her up in a basement, a la Poe's The Black Cat. He then flees as the police and a reporter, Frank Briggs (Harald Paulsen), set out to track him down. Morder eventually escapes, by pretending to be insane, into an asylum. Though here the patients has managed to free themselves, lock up the guards, and take charge (inspired by Poe's The System of Doctor Tarr and Professor Fether). After Morder's final escape, he turns up as president of a secret Suicide Club (based on the short story by Stevenson).

Cast

Release
Unheimliche Geschichten was released in Germany on 7 September 1932.

Reception
In contemporary reviews, Variety declared in 1932 that Oswald had "succeeded in creating an effectively gruesome picture", specifically praising the sound, acting and photography as "excellent".  In 1940, Bosley Crowther reviewed the film under the title The Living Dead  for the New York Times, declaring it "a nightmare reminder of the old pre-Nazi macabre school of German films, which did all right by such things as M, but apparently had its bad moments, too."

Footnotes

References

External links 
 
 
 Unheimliche Geschichten Trailer

1932 films
1932 horror films
1930s German-language films
Films of the Weimar Republic
German black-and-white films
Films based on horror novels
Films based on The Black Cat
Films based on works by Edgar Allan Poe
Films based on works by Robert Louis Stevenson
German black comedy films
Films directed by Richard Oswald 
Films produced by Gabriel Pascal
Films based on multiple works
Films about animals
Films about cats
German comedy horror films
Uxoricide in fiction
1930s comedy horror films
1932 comedy films
1930s German films